Cantus Umbrarum is the fourth studio album by Lightwave, released in 2000 by Horizon Music.

Track listing

Personnel 
Adapted from the Cantus Umbrarum liner notes.

Lightwave
 Christoph Harbonnier – electronics, recording, mixing, illustrations
 Christian Wittman – electronics, voice, art direction\

Additional musicians
 Jacques Derégnaucourt – electronics, violin, viola
 John Greaves – voice
 Marie-Christine Letort – voice
 Renaud Pion – bass clarinet, Turkish clarinet, flute, electronics
 Jean-Luc Revol – voice
 Eric Theobald – voice

Production
 Michel Geiss – mastering
 Lightwave – production

Release history

References

External links 
 Cantus Umbrarum at Discogs (list of releases)

2000 albums
Lightwave (band) albums